Thomas Dow Jones (December 11, 1811 – February 27, 1881) was an American sculptor and medallist. Moses Jacob Ezekiel was his student.

Thomas Dow Jones was born in the United States of America on December 11, 1811, in Oneida County, New York.

He moved to Ohio in the 1830s, where he worked in Cincinnati as a stonemason, and by 1842 was sculpting portrait busts. In 1851 he moved to New York City, and in 1853 was elected an Associate Member of the National Academy of Design.

Jones's best-known works include a bust of Abraham Lincoln commissioned by the leading Republicans of Cincinnati (1861), medallions of Henry Clay and Daniel Webster, and a marble bust of Chief Justice Salmon P. Chase now in the Supreme Court Building. He also produced bas‑relief medallion portraits which were usually cast in plaster. Jones is buried in Welsh Hills Cemetery, Granville, Ohio.

Jones died on 27 February 1881.

References 

 Southern Alleghenies Museum of Art description
 Wayne Craven, Sculpture in America, Crowell, 1968, pages 200, 201.

19th-century American sculptors
19th-century American male artists
American male sculptors
1811 births
1881 deaths
People from Oneida County, New York